Even Yehuda is a town in the central Sharon region of Israel east of Netanya.

History
The area of Even Yehuda has been inhabited intermittently since the Middle Paleolithic age, with peak periods of settlement during the Byzantine (4th  - 7th centuries CE) and Late Ottoman periods (19- early 20th centuries CE). 

Before the 20th century, the territory of Even Yehuda formed part of the Forest of Sharon, a hallmark of the region's historical landscape. It was an open woodland dominated by Mount Tabor Oak (Quercus ithaburensis), which extended from Kfar Yona in the north to Ra'anana in the south. The local Arab inhabitants traditionally used the area for pasture, firewood and intermittent cultivation. The intensification of settlement and agriculture in the coastal plain during the 19th century led to deforestation and subsequent environmental degradation known from Hebrew sources.

Even Yehuda is named for Eliezer Ben-Yehuda, one of the leading figures in the revival of the Hebrew language. It was founded in December 1932 by the Bnei Benyamin society and the Notea corporation. The economy was based on citrus growing.

In 1950, Even Yehuda became a local council, as it was merged with the nearby villages of Be'er Ganim, founded in 1932 by workers of the Dead Sea Works, and Tel Tzur, founded in 1932 by teachers of Herzliya Hebrew Gymnasium led by Haim Boger. Be'er Ganim, originally named Kfar Tzur after the Arab village Ghabat Kafr Sur from which its lands had been purchased, was renamed into its present name in 1933, after a well named Bir el-Ghanem which was located in the area.

Nowadays, Even Yehuda is bordered on the east by Kadima, on the south-east by Tel Mond, on the north by Lev HaSharon, on the west by Netanya and on the south-west by Hof HaSharon.

In 2007, the Walworth Barbour American International School in Israel (WBAIS) moved to a new campus in Even Yehuda.

Education 
Even Yehuda has three elementary schools - "Bachar" school (בכר), "Beit Avi" school (בית אב"י) and "Rishonim" school (ראשונים), all mamlachti schools.

There is a children's village in Even Yehuda called WIZO Canada Children's village (הדסים), which is a middle school and a high school. In the village there are several kindergartens and a Democratic school.

Local features 

 "Sharonim Gardens" (בית גני שרונים) - an assisted living facility for senior citizens
 a museum (מוזיאון הראשונים) about Even Yehuda's history and founders

Notable residents
Shira Rishony (born 1991), Olympic judoka

References

Populated places established in 1932
Jewish villages in Mandatory Palestine
Local councils in Central District (Israel)
1932 establishments in Mandatory Palestine